Reichardia is a genus of parasitic flies in the family Tachinidae.

Species
Reichardia insignis Karsch, 1886

Distribution
Tanzania.

References

Endemic fauna of Tanzania
Diptera of Africa
Dexiinae
Tachinidae genera